
This is a list of aircraft in alphabetical order beginning with the letters 'An' through 'Az'.

An–Az

Anahuac

(Fabrica de Aviones Anahuac)
 Anahuac Tauro

Anatra

(Artur Antonovich Anatra)
 Anatra Anade
 Anatra Anamon
 Anatra Anasal
 Anatra Anakle
 Anatra Anadva
 Anatra D
 Anatra DE
 Anatra DS
 Anatra DSS
 Anatra Voisin-Ivanov (V.I.)
 Anatra Anadva-Salmson

ANBO

(Karo Aviacijos Tiekimo Skyrius - Military Aviation Supply Department)
(ANBO - Antanas Nori Būti Ore – "Antanas wants to be airborne")
 ANBO I
 ANBO II
 ANBO III
 ANBO IV
 ANBO 41
 ANBO V
 ANBO 51
 ANBO VI
 ANBO VII
 ANBO VIII

Andermat 

(Andermat Aeroplane Co)
 Andermat 1916 Biplane

Anderson 

(Anderson Aircraft Mfg Co)
 Welch Biplane

Anderson 

(Louis "Andy" Anderson)
 Anderson #1
 Anderson #2
 Anderson #3
 Anderson Scampy
 Anderson Baby A

Anderson 

(Andrew A. Anderson)
 Anderson Z

Anderson 

(Maynard B Anderson)
 Anderson Honey Bee
 Anderson R-1 Rotorplane

Anderson 

((Alvin E) Anderson Propeller Co)
 Anderson Special

Anderson

(Anderson Aircraft Corporation / Earl Anderson, Delray Beach, FL)
 Anderson EA-1 Kingfisher

Anderson Greenwood

((Ben M) Anderson, (Marvin H) Greenwood & Co)
 Anderson Greenwood AG-14
 Anderson Greenwood 51

Anderson-Gewert 

(Charles Lee Anderson & E R Gewert, Reno, NV)
 Anderson-Gewert Racing Model

Andiz 

(Andiz Aircraft Corp)
 Andiz 2-60
 Andiz C-2

Andreae 

(F O Andreae)
 Andreae 1909 Multiplane

Andreasson 

(Bjorn Andreasson, San Diego, CA)
 Andreasson BA-4
 Andreasson BA-6
 Andreasson BA-7
 Andreasson BA-11

Andrews 

(Edward F Andrews)
 Andrews 1910 Biplane

Andrews 

(C.G. Andrews, New Zealand)
 Andrews A1
 Andrews A2

Andrews-Acre 

 Andrews-Acre monoplane

Andrews & Nicholson 

(Henry G Andrews & Ray E Nicholson)
 Andrews & Nicholson T-1

ANEC 
(Air Navigation and Engineering Company)
 ANEC I
 ANEC II
 ANEC III
 ANEC IV

Anequim
(Anequim Project Team)
 Anequim Project Team Anequim

ANF Les Mureaux

(Atelier du Nord de la France Les Mureaux / Ateliers Les Mureaux)
 Les Mureaux 3
 Les Mureaux 4
 ANF Les Mureaux 110
 ANF Les Mureaux 111
 ANF Les Mureaux 112
 ANF Les Mureaux 113
 ANF Les Mureaux 114
 ANF Les Mureaux 115
 ANF Les Mureaux 117
 ANF Les Mureaux 119
 ANF Les Mureaux 120
 ANF Les Mureaux 121
 ANF Les Mureaux 130 A2
 ANF Les Mureaux 131 A2
 ANF Les Mureaux 140
 ANF Les Mureaux 160
 ANF Les Mureaux 170
 ANF Les Mureaux 180
 ANF Les Mureaux 190
 ANF Les Mureaux 200
 A.N.F. 'Express Les Mureaux'
 A.N.F. Les Mureaux 'Express-Marin'

Anglin

(Jesse Anglin)
Anglin J6 Karatoo
Anglin J6B Australian Karatoo
Anglin J6C Australian Karatoo

Angus 

(Arthur Leighton Angus)
 Angus Aquila

Ann Arbor 

(Ann Arbor Air Service)
 Brundage R-3

Ansaldo 

(Ansaldo Aeronautica, 336 Corso Francia, Turin, Italy)

 Ansaldo A.1 Balilla
 Ansaldo A.115
 Ansaldo A.120
 Ansaldo A.300
 Ansaldo AC.1
 Ansaldo AC.2
 Ansaldo AC.3
 Ansaldo AC.4
 Ansaldo ISVA
 Ansaldo SVA.1
 Ansaldo SVA.2
 Ansaldo SVA.3
 Ansaldo SVA.4
 Ansaldo SVA.5
 Ansaldo SVA.6
 Ansaldo SVA.8
 Ansaldo SVA.9
 Ansaldo SVA.10

Antares Aircraft

(Antares Aircraft, Ukraine)
Antares MA-32
Antares A-10R503 SOLO
Antares MA-32 R503
Antares MA-32 R582 G
Antares MA-33
Antares MA-33M R582
Antares MA-33M R912
Antares MA-34 R912 Ranger
Antares MA-34R912S Beaver
Antares MA-34 Open Country
Antares MA-34 R582XB Crop Duster

Antilles

 Antilles Goose

Antique Aero 

(Antique Aero, Asbury Park, NJ)
 Antique Aero Replica Albatros D.V
 Antique Aero Replica Albatros D.Va
 Antique Aero Replica Fokker D.VII
 Antique Aero Replica Fokker Dr.I
 Antique Aero Replica Fokker E.III
 Antique Aero Replica Nieuport 28
 Antique Aero Replica Sopwith 1½ Strutter
 Antique Aero Replica Sopwith Camel
 Antique Aero Replica Sopwith Pup

Antoinette 

(Léon Levavasseur)
 Antoinette I
 Antoinette II
 Antoinette III
 Antoinette IV
 Antoinette V
 Antoinette VI
 Antoinette VII
 Antoinette VIII
 Antoinette Latham (Antoinette IV with extended wings and a melange of IV and V undercarriage parts.)
 Antoinette military monoplane
 Antoinette Gastambide Mengin

Antonov 

 Antonov A-1
 Antonov A-2
 Antonov A-7
 Antonov A-9
 Antonov A-10
 Antonov A-11
 Antonov A-13
 Antonov A-15
 Antonov A-40
 Antonov An-2
 Antonov An-3
 Antonov An-4
 Antonov An-6
 Antonov An-8
 Antonov An-10
 Antonov An-12
 Antonov An-13
 Antonov An-14
 Antonov An-16
 Antonov An-22
 Antonov An-24
 Antonov An-26
 Antonov An-28
 Antonov An-30
 Antonov An-32
 Antonov An-38
 Antonov An-40
 Antonov An-42
 Antonov An-50
 Antonov An-70
 Antonov An-71
 Antonov An-72
 Antonov An-74
 Antonov An-124
 Antonov An-132
 Antonov An-140
 Antonov An-148
 Antonov An-158
 Antonov An-174
 Antonov An-178
 Antonov An-180
 Antonov An-204
 Antonov An-218
 Antonov An-225
 Antonov An-325
 Antonov An-400
 Antonov An-418
 Antonov E-153
 Antonov OKA-38
 Antonov SKh-1
 Antonov SKV
 Antonov T-2M Maverick
 Antonov LEM-2
 Antonov-Beriev Be-20
 Antonov 181

Anzani 

(Alexandre Anzani)
 Anzani 1909 Monoplane (aka "de Mas Monoplane" after a probable sponsor)

Apco Aviation

(Caesarea, Israel)

Apco Activa
Apco Air Xtreme
Apco Allegra
Apco Bagheera
Apco Enigma
Apco Extra
Apco Fiesta
Apco Force
Apco Fun
Apco Futura
Apco Game
Apco HiLite
Apco Karma
Apco Keara
Apco Lift
Apco NRG
Apco Play
Apco Presta
Apco Prima
Apco Salsa
Apco Santana
Apco Sierra
Apco Simba
Apco Speedstar
Apco Starlite
Apco System K
Apco Tetra
Apco Tigra
Apco Thrust
Apco Twister
Apco Vista
Apco Zefira

APEV

(Association pour la Promotion des Echelles Volantes, (English: Association for the Promotion of Flying Ladders), Peynier, France)
 APEV Bipochel
 APEV Cubchel
 APEV Demoichelle
 APEV Pouchel
 APEV Pouchel II
 APEV Pouchel Light
 APEV Pouchel Classic
 APEV Pouchelec
 APEV Scoutchel

Apex

(Apex Aviation, Czech Republic)
Apex Eco 6
Apex Dolphin 3
Apex Cross 5

Apex 

(Apex Aircraft)
 Apex Robin
 Apex CAP-10
 Apex CAP-232
 Apex Alpha 2000

Apollo Ultralight Aircraft

(Apollo Ultralight Aircraft / Halley Ltd., Eger, Hungary)
Apollo C15D Toples
Apollo Classic
Apollo Delta Jet
Apollo Delta Jet 2
Apollo Fox
Apollo Gyro AG1
Apollo Jet Star
Apollo Monsoon
Apollo Racer GT

Applebay 

 Applebay Chiricahua
 Applebay Mescalero
 Applebay Zia
 Applebay Zuni
 Applebay Zuni II

Applegate 

((Ray) Applegate Amphibians, Lock Haven, PA)
 Applegate Amphibian

Applegate-Weyant 

(Applegate & Weyant, Tecumseh MI, Elkhart, IN)
 Applegate-Weyant Dart GC

Aquaflight

(Aquaflight Inc, 1601 Harrison Ave, Wilmington, DE)
 Aquaflight Aqua I
 Aquaflight Aqua II
 Aquaflight W-6
 Aquaflight W-6A

Aquila

(Aquila Aviation by Excellence)
 Aquila A 210
 Aquila A 211

Aquilair

(Theize, France)
Aquilair Kid
Aquilair Swing
Aquilair Chariot Biplace
Aquilair Chariot Monoplace

Arado 

(Arado Flugzeugwerke GmbH)
(For WWII projects with no RLM designation see: List of German aircraft projects, 1939-1945)
 Arado Ar 64
 Arado Ar 65
 Arado Ar 66
 Arado Ar 67
 Arado Ar 68
 Arado Ar 69
 Arado Ar 75
 Arado Ar 76
 Arado Ar 77
 Arado Ar 79
 Arado Ar 80
 Arado Ar 81
 Arado Ar 95
 Arado Ar 96
 Arado Ar 195
 Arado Ar 196
 Arado Ar 197
 Arado Ar 198
 Arado Ar 199
 Arado Ar 231
 Arado Ar 232
 Arado Ar 233 was a twin-engine, high-wing, ten-passenger touring and communications seaplane not built
 Arado Ar 234 Blitz
 Arado Ar 234 B-2
 Arado Ar 239 Project
 Arado Ar 240
 Arado Ar 296
 Arado Ar 334 Project
 Arado Ar 340 was a twin-engine, twin-boom medium bomber project
 Arado Ar 396
 Arado Ar 430
 Arado Ar 432
 Arado Ar 440
 Arado Ar 532 was a projected development of Ar 432
 Arado Ar 632 was a projected development of Ar 432 four engines transport aircraft
 Arado L I
 Arado L II
 Arado S I
 Arado S III
 Arado SC I
 Arado SC II
 Arado SD I
 Arado SD II
 Arado SD III
 Arado SSD I
 Arado V I
 Arado W 2

ARAF 

 ARAF Cammandre 1

Arco 

(Arco Aircraft Co (founders: J T & Richard Arwine))
 Arco 1930 Sportplane

Arctic Aircraft

(Arctic Aviation / Arctic Aircraft Co (fdr: Bill Diehl))
 Arctic Aircraft Arctic Tern

ARDC

(Aeronautical Research and Development Corporation)
 ARDC RP-440 Omega

Arey

(Krasnoyarsk, Russia)
Arey Tatush
Arey Telezhka

Argonaut 

(Argonaut Aircraft Inc)
 Argonaut H.20 Pirate
 Argonaut H.24 Pirate

Argus

(Argus Motoren GmbH)
 Argus As 292 - see DFS Mo 12

Ariel 
(Stearman-Jensen Aircraft Co / Stearman Aviation Incorporated / Ariel Aircraft Inc (Glenn A Stearman, Pres))
 Ariel A
 Ariel B

Arion 

 Arion Lightning

Arizona Airways 

(Arizona Airways Inc)
 Arizona Airways Whitewing

Arkansas 

 Arkansas CX-3

Arkhangelsky 

 Arkhangelsky Ar-2
 Arkhangelsky SBB

Arlais 

 Arlais AC.210

Armada 

((Bert) Acosta Aviation, Trenton, NJ)
 Armada A

Armel 

(M C Armel, 243 E Daugherty St, Athens, GA)
 Armel White Dove Commercial

Armella-Senemaud

(Armella & Senemaud)
 Armella-Senemaud AS.10 Mistral

Armitage 

(George Armitage, Providence, RI)
 Armitage 1910 Monoplane
 Armitage S-8

Armstrong-Siddeley 

 Armstrong-Siddeley Sinaia (1921) - Bomber (1 built)

Armstrong Whitworth 

Sir W. G. Armstrong Whitworth & Company (1912–1920) Sir W. G. Armstrong Whitworth Aircraft Company (1920–1927) Armstrong Whitworth Aircraft (1927–1963)
 Armstrong Whitworth Ajax
 Armstrong Whitworth Albemarle
 Armstrong Whitworth Apollo
 Armstrong Whitworth Ara
 Armstrong Whitworth Argosy
 Armstrong Whitworth Aries
 Armstrong Whitworth F.M.4 Armadillo
 Armstrong Whitworth Atalanta
 Armstrong Whitworth Atlas
 Armstrong Whitworth AW.16
 Armstrong Whitworth AW.52
 Armstrong Whitworth AW.52G
 Armstrong Whitworth AW.171
 Armstrong Whitworth AW.660 Argosy
 Armstrong Whitworth AW.681
 Armstrong Whitworth Awana
 Armstrong Whitworth Ensign
 Armstrong Whitworth F.K.1
 Armstrong Whitworth F.K.2
 Armstrong Whitworth F.K.3
 Armstrong Whitworth F.K.4
 Armstrong Whitworth F.K.5
 Armstrong Whitworth F.K.6
 Armstrong Whitworth F.K.7
 Armstrong Whitworth F.K.8
 Armstrong Whitworth F.K.9
 Armstrong Whitworth F.K.10
 Armstrong Whitworth F.K.12
 Armstrong Whitworth F.K.13
 Armstrong Whitworth Sea Hawk
 Armstrong Whitworth Scimitar
 Armstrong Whitworth Siskin
 Armstrong Whitworth Sissit
 Armstrong Whitworth Starling
 Armstrong Whitworth Whitley
 Armstrong Whitworth Wolf

Arnet Pereyra Inc 

 Arnet Pereyra Buccaneer
 Arnet Pereyra Buccaneer II
 Arnet Pereyra Sabre II

Arnold 
(Mike Arnold, Pinole CA.)
 Arnold AR-5
 Arnold AR-6(Hoover AR-6)

Arnoud 

 Arnoud 1911 Biplane

Arnoux
(René Arnoux / Société des Avions Simplex)
 Arnoux 1909 Biplane (No.1)
 Arnoux 1912 Monoplane (No.2)
 Arnoux Stabloplan 1912 (No.3)
 Arnoux Stablavion 1913 (No.4)
 Arnoux Stabloplan 1914 (No.5)
 Arnoux Simplex 10hp
 Arnoux Simplex 320hp
 Arnoux HD14 sans Queue 1923

Arocet

(Arocet Inc, Arlington, WA)
 Arocet AT-9
 Arocet AT-T Tactical Trainer

Arpin

 Arpin A-1

Arplast Helice

Arplast Micro'B

Arrow

(Arrow Aircraft Ltd.)
 Arrow Active

Arrow

(Arrow Aircraft & Motors Corp)
 Arrow Five
 Arrow Sedan
 Arrow Model F
 Arrow Sport
 Arrow Sport Pursuit

Arrowhead 

(Safety Aircraft Corp (B L Smith), Miami, FL)
 Safety Airplane B-2

Arrowplane 

(Arrowplane Mfg Co)
 Arrowplane 1910 Biplane

Arsenal 

(Arsenal de l'Aéronautique) (renamed as SFECMAS - Société Française d’étude Et de Construction de Matériels Aéronautiques Spéciaux in 1949)
Source:
 Arsenal O.101
 Arsenal VB 10
 Arsenal VB 11
 Arsenal VB 12
 Arsenal VB 14
 Arsenal VG 10
 Arsenal VG 20
 Arsenal VG 30
 Arsenal VG 31
 Arsenal VG 32
 Arsenal VG 33
 Arsenal VG 34
 Arsenal VG 35
 Arsenal VG 36
 Arsenal VG 37
 Arsenal VG 38
 Arsenal VG 39
 Arsenal VG 40
 Arsenal VG 50
 Arsenal VG 60
 Arsenal VG 70
 Arsenal VG 80
 Arsenal VG 90
 Arsenal-Delanne 10
 Arsenal 1301
 Arsenal 2301

Arsenalul 

(Arsenalul Aeronautic - Bucharest)
 Arsenalul Aeron
 Arsenalul Brandemburg
 Arsenalul Proto 1

Arts & Métiers 

 Arts & Métiers AM-69

Artois

(Chantiers de l'Artois)
 d'Artois 'Aérotorpille'
 d'Artois 'Hydroaéroplane'

Artomov 

(Mikhail Artomov)
 Artomov Simburg

Arup 

(Arup Manufacturing Corporation (fdr: Cloyd L Snyder))
 Arup S-1
 Arup S-2
 Arup S-3
 Arup S-4

ARV 

(Canada Air RV and later by AC Millennium Corp)
 ARV Griffin

ARV 

(ARV, United Kingdom)
 ARV Super2

ASA (aircraft constructor)

 ASA-200

Asboth 

(Oscar von Asboth)
 Asboth 1908 biplane
 Asboth AH-1
 Asboth AH-2
 Asboth AH-3
 Asboth AH-4

Ascanio

 Ascanio Helicopter

Ascension 

 Ascension 1908 Aircraft

Ashley 

(David Dexter Ashley)
 Ashley SP-5 Bob-O-Link

Svenska Aero/ASJA 

(AktieBolaget Svenska Järnvägsverkstädernas Aeroplanavdelning)
 ASJA SA 11/J5 Jaktfalken
 ASJA SA 14/J6 Jaktfalken I/II
 ASJA F1
 ASJA L1 Viking
 ASJA L2
 ASJA L10
 ASJA L11
 ASJA L12 (SAAB J19)
 ASJA Viking II
 ASJA Sk10 Tigerschwalbe (Raab-Katzenstein RK-26 Tigerschwalbe)

Ask-Nyrop
(Oscar Ask and Hjalmar Nyrop)
Ask-Nyrop Monoplane No.1 Gräshoppan (obviously greatly inspired by the Bleriot XI)

Askew 

(Charles E Askew)
 Askew M-3

ASL 

(Aeronautical Syndicate Ltd)
 ASL monoplane No.1
 ASL monoplane No.2
 ASL Valkyrie I (Type A)
 ASL Valkyrie II (Type C)
 ASL Valkyrie III (Type B)
 ASL Passenger Carrier (Type C)
 ASL Racer (Type B)
 ASL Viking

ASO

(Air Sud Ouest)
 ASO-1070 Griffon

Asso Aerei

(Giuseppe Vidor, Italy)
 Asso I
 Asso II
 Asso III
 Asso IV Whiskey
 Asso V Champion
 Asso V Jolly
 Asso V X-Ray
 Asso VI Junior
 Asso VI Evolution
 Asso VII
 Asso VIII Centauro
 Asso IX Warrior
 Asso X Jewel
 Asso XI Sprint
 Asso XIV Spitfire

Associated 

 Associated 1929 Monoplane

Associated Air

(Woodland, WA)
Associated Air Liberty 181

Ast 

(Carl & Vincent Ast, Van Nuys, CA)
 Ast Special
 Ast Mercury Air

ASTA

(Aerospace Technologies of Australia Pty. Ltd.)
 ASTA Nomad

Asteria 

 Asteria No. 3

Aston Martin 

 Aston Martin Volante Vision Concept

Astoux-Védrines 

(L.L. Astoux (designer) & Jules Charles Toussaint Védrines (pilot))
 Astoux-Védrines Triplane

Astra 

(Astra of Arad, Romania) (aircraft production moved to IAR in 1925)
 Astra-Proto
 Astra-Şeşefski
 Proto-1
 Proto-2
 Proto-S.E.T.-2

Astra

(Société de Constructions Aéronautiques Astra)
 Astra-Wright Type A
 Astra-Wright Type 1910
 Astra-Wright BB
 Astra-Wright Type L
 Astra-Wright Type E
 Astra Type C
 Astra Type CM
 Astra Type CM Hydro
 Astra Triplane
 Astra-Kapferer tandem monoplane
 Astra 1916 bomber
 Astra-Paulhan flying boat

AstroFlight 

 AstroFlight Sunrise

AT & T Company 

 AT & T Company Aquaglide-5

ATA 

 ATA Cruiser

Atlanta

 Atlanta Aircraft Corporation, aka Prudden-Whitehead (founders: George H. Prudden, Edward Whitehead)
See: Prudden

Atalante

Atalante GB-10

ATEC v.o.s.

(Libice nad Cidlinou, Czech Republic)
ATEC 122 Zephyr 2000
ATEC 212 Solo
ATEC 321 Faeta

ATE-International 

 ATE Saphire

Ateliers Aeronautique de Boulogne 

 Ateliers Aeronautique de Boulogne Ju 88

Ateliers Aeronautique de Colombes 

 Ateliers Aeronautique de Colombes AAC.1

Ateliers Aéronautiques de Suresnes 

 Ateliers Aeronautique de Suresnes AAS.01

Ateliers Fred Herrmann 

 De Glymes DG X

Atelier Technique Aéronautique de Rickenbach 

 ATAR-23

ATG 

(Aviation Technology Group Inc, Englewood, CO)
 ATG Javelin

Atlanta 

(Atlanta Aircraft Corp, (founders: George H Prudden, Edward Whitehead) Atlanta, GA)
 Atlanta PW-1
 Atlanta PW-2

Atlantic

(Atlantic Aircraft Co.)
 Atlantic Battleplane

Atlantic, Atlantic-Fokker 

see Fokker

Atlantic Coast (aircraft constructor) 

 Atlantic Coast F-5L

Atlas 

 Atlas ACE
 Atlas Alpha XH-1
 Atlas Cheetah
 Atlas Kudu
 Atlas Impala
 Atlas Oryx
 Atlas XH-2

Atlas

(Atlas Aircraft Corp, Hemet, CA)
 Atlas Blitzfighter/Bushwacker
 Atlas H-10
 Ling Temco Vought/Atlas A100
 Ling Temco Vought/Atlas A201

ATOL 

 ATOL 495
 ATOL 650

ATR 

(Avion de Transport Régional)
 ATR-42
 ATR-52
 ATR-72

Atwood 

(Harry N Atwood, Saugus, MA
 Atwood-Wright 1911 Biplane
 Atwood 1913 Biplane

Aubert Aviation

(Paul Aubert)
 Aubert PA-20 Cigale
 Aubert PA-201 Cigale
 Aubert PA-204 Cigale Major
 Aubert PA-205 Super Cigale
 Aubert PA-300 Grillon

Aubiet 

(Marceau Aubiet)
 Aubiet 1922 man powered aeroplane

Audenis
(Charles Audenis and Jean Jacob)
 Audenis E.P.2
 Audenis C2

Auffm-Ordt

(Clément Auffm-Ordt)
Auffm-Ordt monoplan 1908

Aura Aero
 Aura Aero Integral R

Aurebach 

(R H Aurebach)
 Aurebach Wasp Special

AURI

(Angkatan Udara Republik Indonesia, Depot Penjelidikan, Pertjobaan dan Pembutan - Indonesian Air force research, development, and production depot)

see Indonesian Aerospace

Aurora 
 Aurora Concept Plane

Aurore Sarl

(Sauvagnon, France)
Aurore MB 02 Souricette
Aurore MB 02-2 Mini Bulle
Aurore MB 04 Souris Bulle

Ausmus 

(Reinhardt Ausmus, Sandusky, OH)
 Ausmus 1912 Monoplane

Auster 

 Auster A.2/45
 Auster AOP.3

 Auster AOP.6
 Auster AOP.8 (not built)
 Auster AOP.9
 Auster AOP.11
 Auster T.7
 Auster T.7 Antarctic
 Auster T.10
 Auster Adventurer
 Auster Agricola
 Auster Aiglet
 Auster Aiglet Trainer
 Auster Alpha
 Auster Alpine
 Auster Arrow
 Auster Atom
 Auster Autocar
 Auster Autocrat
 Auster Avis
 Auster Workmaster
 Taylorcraft Plus C - licence-built Taylorcraft B
 Taylorcraft Plus D - re-engined Plus C.
 Taylorcraft Auster Model D - Auster I - military version of Plus C with enlarged windows.
 Taylorcraft Auster Model E - Auster III - re-engined Auster I with split flaps.
 Taylorcraft Auster Model F - Auster II - re-engined Auster I.
 Taylorcraft Auster Model G - Auster IV - enlarged version of Auster III.
 Taylorcraft Auster Model H - Experimental tandem two-seat training glider converted from Taylorcraft B.
 Taylorcraft Auster Model J - Auster V - Auster IV with blind-flying instruments.
 Taylorcraft Auster I - military version of Plus C with enlarged windows.
 Taylorcraft Auster II - re-engined Auster I.
 Taylorcraft Auster III - re-engined Auster I with split flaps.
 Taylorcraft Auster IV - enlarged version of Auster III.
 Taylorcraft Auster V - Auster IV with blind-flying instruments.
 Auster J-1 Autocrat - Three-seat high-winged monoplane light aircraft (fitted with Blackburn Cirrus Minor II engine)
 Auster J-1A Autocrat - Four-seat version of Autocrat
 Auster J-1B Aiglet - Re-engined agricultural version of Autocraft (De Havilland Gipsy Major engine)
 Auster J-1N Alpha - Re-engined four-seat Autocrat (De Havilland Gipsy Major engine)
 Auster J-1S Autocrat
 Auster J-1U Workmaster - Agricultural version of the Alpha
 Auster J-2 Arrow
 Auster J-3 Atom - low-powered version of Arrow with Continental engine
 Auster J-4 - Arrow with Blackburn Cirrus Minor I engine
 Auster J-5 Autocar
 Auster J-5Q Alpine
 Auster J-5R Alpine
 Auster J-8L Aiglet Trainer
 Auster 6A Tugmaster - Glider towing conversion of the Auster 6
 Auster 6B / Beagle Terrier - civil conversion of the Auster 6
 Auster 9M
 Auster Model K - A.O.P.6
 Auster Model L Proposed low-wing monoplane, not built.
 Auster Model M - Auster A2/45 - 2 or 3-seat high-wing AOP aircraft, prototype only.
 Auster Model N - Auster A2/45 - Re-engined Model M, prototype only.
 Auster Model P - Auster Avis - four-seater based on J/1 with slimmer fuselage, two built.
 Auster Model Q - Auster T7 - two-seat trainer version of AOP6.
 Auster Model S - AOP aircraft based on AOP6 with enlarged tail, prototype only.
 Auster Model A.7 Light twin project, not built.
 Auster Model B.1 Mid-wing AOP project, not built.
 Auster Model B.3 - radio-controlled target drone.
 Auster Model B.4
 Auster Model B.5 - AOP.9
 Auster Model B.6 low-wing agricultural project, not built.
 Auster Model B.8 - Auster B.8 Agricola - Low-winged agricultural aircraft
 Auster Model B.9 Ramjet helicopter project, not built
 Auster Model C.4 - Auster Antarctic - Modified Auster T7 for Antarctic support.
 Auster Model C.6 - Auster Atlantic - four-seat high-wing touring monoplane with tricycle undercarriage, one built.
 Auster Model D.4
 Auster Model D.5
 Auster Model D.6
 Auster Model D.8 - Original designation of Beagle Airedale.
 Auster Model E.8 - AOP9 with modified engines as the AOP11.

Austin 

(F C Austin, Lake Worth, FL)
 Austin 1935 Monoplane

Austin Motor Company

 Austin-Ball A.F.B.1
 Austin A.F.T.3 Osprey
 Austin Greyhound
 Austin Kestrel
 Austin Whippet

Australian Aircraft & Engineering Company

 Australian Aircraft & Engineering Company Commercial B1

Australian Aircraft Industries 

 AAI AA-2 Mamba

Australian Aircraft Kits

(Australian Aircraft Kits Pty Ltd, Taree, New South Wales, Australia)
Australian Aircraft Kits Bushman
Australian Aircraft Kits Hornet Cub 
Australian Aircraft Kits Hornet STOL
Australian Aircraft Kits Wasp

Australian Autogyro

 Australian Autogyro Skyhook

AIC

(Australian Industrial Corporation)
 AIC AA-2 Mamba

Australian Lightwing

(Howard Hughes Engineering, Ballina, New South Wales, Australia)
Australian Lightwing GR 582
Australian Lightwing GR 912
Australian Lightwing Pocket Rocket 
Australian Lightwing PR BiPe
Australian Lightwing PR Breeze
Australian Lightwing SP-2000 Speed
Australian Lightwing SP-4000 Speed
Australian Lightwing SP-6000
Australian Lightwing Sport 2000
Australian Lightwing Tapis

Australian Ultralight Industries

 Australian Ultralight Industries Bunyip

Auto-Aero 

 Auto-Aero Gobe R-26S

Autogiro 

(Autogiro Company of America (patent-licensing division of Pitcairn Co), Willow Grove, PA)
 Autogiro Company of America AC-35

AutoGyro 

(AutoGyro GmbH)
 AutoGyro MT-03
 AutoGyro MTOsport
 AutoGyro Calidus
 AutoGyro Cavalon
 AutoGyro eCavalon

Av8er Limited

(Woodford Halse, Northamptonshire, United Kingdom)
Av8er Explorer
Av8er Observer Light
Av8er Orbiter

AV Leichtflugzeuge 

 AV Vagabund

AV Leichtflugzeuge

(Haren, Germany)
AV Leichtflugzeuge Vagabund

AVA 

(Aerodynamische Versuchsanstalt, Göttingen)
 AVA AF 1
 AVA AF 2

Avalon

 Avalon Turbo Canso

Avama

(Avama s.r.o., Poprad, Slovakia)
Avama Stylus

AvCraft 
AvCraft Aerospace)
 AvCraft-Dornier Do328jet

AVDI 
(AViacijas DIvizions)
 AVDI

AVE 

(Advanced Vehicle Engineers)
 AVE Mizar

Aveko

(Aveko s.r.o., Brno, Czech Republic)
Aveko VL-3 Sprint

AVEX
(asociacion Argentina de constructores de AViones EXperimentales)
 AVEX Armar I Gorrion ( Yves Arambide & Norberto Marino)
 AVEX Ghinassi helicopter (Sesto Ghinassi)
 AVEX Yakstas racer (Adolfo Yakstas)

AVI
(AVI, Argentina)
 AVI HF2/185
 AVI 185
 AVI 205 
 AVI 225

AVIA

(Ateliers vosgiens d'industrie aéronautique)
 AVIA X-A
 AVIA XI-A
 AVIA XV-A
 AVIA XX-A
 AVIA 22A
 AVIA 30E
 AVIA 32E
 AVIA 40P
 AVIA 41P
 AVIA 50MP
 AVIA 60MP
 AVIA 151A
 AVIA 152A

Avia 

(Avia-Zavody Jirího Dimitrova, Czechoslovakia)
 Avia 14
 Avia 36
 Avia 51
 Avia 57
 Avia 156
 Avia 236
 Avia B-33
 Avia B-34
 Avia B-234
 Avia B-334
 Avia B-434
 Avia B-534
 Avia B-634
 Avia B-35
 Avia B-135
 Avia B.71
 Avia B-122
 Avia Ba-122
 Avia Bs-122
 Avia Ba-222
 Avia Ba-322
 Avia Ba-422
 Avia B-158
 Avia BH-1
 Avia BH-2
 Avia BH-3
 Avia BH-4
 Avia BH-5
 Avia BH-6
 Avia BH-7
 Avia BH-7A
 Avia BH-7B
 Avia BH-8
 Avia BH-9
 Avia BH-10
 Avia BH-11
 Avia BH-12
 Avia BH-16
 Avia BH-17
 Avia BH-19
 Avia BH-20
 Avia BH-21
 Avia BH-21J
 Avia BH-22
 Avia BH-23
 Avia BH-25
 Avia BH-26
 Avia BH-27
 Avia BH-28
 Avia BH-29
 Avia BH-33
 Avia C.2b
 Avia F.IX
 Avia F.39
 Avia F.139
 Avia S-92
 Avia S-99
 Avia S-199
 Avia BH-11B Antilopa (Antelope)

AVIA
(Azionaria Vercallese Industrie Aeronautiche)
 AVIA FL.3
 AVIA LM.51
 AVIA LM.02

Avia
(Avia Scientific-Production Association JSC -Nauchno-Proizodstvennoe Obedinenie Avia Ltd.)
 Avia Accord-201

Aviacor
(Aviacor Aviation Depot JSC - Aviakor Aviatsionnoye Zavod OAO)

Aviad
(Aviad Francesco Di Martino)
 Aviad Zigolo MG12

Aviadesign
(Aviadesign Inc, Camarillo, CA)
Aviadesign A-16 Sport Falcon

Aviafiber 

 Aviafiber Canard 2FL

Aviaimpex 

 Aviaimpex Angel

Aviakit

(Aviakit Flight Concept SARL)
Aviakit Vega

Aviamilano

(Aviamilano Costruzione Aeronautiche)
 Aviamilano CPV1
 Aviamilano A-2
 Aviamilano A-3
 Aviamilano F.250
 Aviamilano F.260
 Aviamilano Falco
 Aviamilano Nibbio
 Aviamilano P.19 Scricciolo (Wren)

Aviaimpeks 

 Aviaimpex Yanhol

Avian 

(Avian Aircraft Ltd.)
 Avian 2/180 Gyroplane

Aviana

 Aviana 10

Aviasouz

(Kazan, Russia)
Aviasouz Chemist
Aviasouz Cruise

Aviastroitel

 Aviastroitel AC-4 Russia Россия АС-4
 Aviastroitel AC-5M
 Aviastroitel AC-6
 Aviastroitel AC-7
 Aviastroitel AC-7M
 Aviastroitel AC-8

Aviasud 

Aviasud Albatros
Aviasud Mistral
Aviasud Sirocco

Aviat 

(Aviat Aircraft Inc,)
 Aviat 110 Special
 Aviat A-1A
 Aviat A-1B Husky
 Aviat Husky Pup
 Aviat Eagle II
 Aviat S-1
 Aviat S-2
 Aviat Husky

Aviata 

 Aviata GM-1 Gniady

Aviate Products

(Booysens, South Africa)
Aviate Raptor

Aviatik 

(Automobil und Aviatik A.G. / Automobil und Aviatikwerke Leipzig-Helterblick)
 Aviatik B.I
 Aviatik B.II (Germany)
 Aviatik B.III
 Aviatik C.I
 Aviatik C.II
 Aviatik C.III
 Aviatik C.V
 Aviatik C.VI
 Aviatik C.VII
 Aviatik C.VIII
 Aviatik C.IX
 Aviatik D.I ( Halberstadt )
 Aviatik D.II
 Aviatik D.III
 Aviatik D.IV
 Aviatik D.V
 Aviatik D.VI
 Aviatik D.VII
 Aviatik G.I
 Aviatik Dr.I
 Aviatik R.III
 Aviatik A 2
 Aviatik F 37
 Aviatik P 1
 Aviatik P 13
 Aviatik P 14
 Aviatik P 15
 Aviatik Doppeldekker Type Militär (P 13)
 Aviatik floatplane
 Aviatik-Farman pusher biplane
 Aviatik-Hanriot monoplane

Aviatik (Austro-Hungarian) 

(Österreichish-Ungarische Flugzeugfabrik Aviatik)
Data from:Austro-Hungarian Army Aircraft of World War One

Note: As with other Austro-Hungarian manufacturers, The Austrian Aviatik company was allocated a number series for prototypes and experimental aircraft (series 30). Some of these were actually production aircraft with modifications but most were distinct aircraft or variants. Production Aviatik aircraft delivered to the LFT are disambiguated from German production by the (Ö) or (Berg) qualifier, after Österreich / Oberingenieur Julius von Berg, chief engineer from mid-1916.
 Aviatik 30.03
 Aviatik 30.04
 Aviatik 30.04
 Aviatik 30.06
 Aviatik 30.07 (Gr.I)
 Aviatik 30.08
 Aviatik 30.09
 Aviatik 30.10
 Aviatik 30.04
 Aviatik 30.04
 Aviatik 30.12
 Aviatik 30.13
 Aviatik 30.14 (1st)
 Aviatik 30.14 (2nd)
 Aviatik 30.15
 Aviatik 30.16
 Aviatik 30.17 (Gr.II)
 Aviatik 30.18 (Gr.III)
 Aviatik 30.19
 Aviatik 30.20
 Aviatik 30.21
 Aviatik 30.22
 Aviatik 30.23
 Aviatik 30.24
 Aviatik 30.25
 Aviatik 30.26
 Aviatik 30.27
 Aviatik 30.28
 Aviatik 30.29
 Aviatik 30.30
 Aviatik 30.31
 Aviatik 30.32
 Aviatik 30.33
 Aviatik 30.34
 Aviatik 30.35
 Aviatik 30.36
 Aviatik 30.37
 Aviatik 30.38
 Aviatik 30.39
 Aviatik 30.40
 Aviatik 30.41
 Aviatik 30.42
 Aviatik series 32 (B.II Austro-Hungarian)
 Aviatik series 32.7 (B.II Austro-Hungarian)
 Aviatik series 33 (B.III)
 Aviatik series 34 (B.II Austro-Hungarian)
 Aviatik series 35 (Knoller )
 Aviatik series 36 (Knoller )
 Aviatik series 37 (C.I)
 Aviatik series 38 (D.I)
 Aviatik series 39 (D.II)
 Aviatik series 131 (G.III)
 Aviatik series 132 (B.II)
 Aviatik series 136 (Knoller )
 Aviatik series 137 (C.I)
 Aviatik series 138 (D.I)
 Aviatik series 238 (D.I)
 Aviatik series 338 (D.I)
 Aviatik series 339 (D.II)
 Aviatik (Ö) B.II
 Aviatik (Ö) B.III
 Aviatik (Ö) C.I
 Aviatik (Berg) D.I
 Aviatik (Berg) D.II
 Aviatik (Berg) Dr.I
 Aviatik (Ö) G.III
 Aviatik (Ö) Gr.I

Aviatik Alliance 
 Aviatik Alliance Aleks-251

Aviatika 
(formerly MAI)
 Aviatika-MAI-890
 Aviatika-900 Akrobat
 Aviatika-92

Aviation Division
(AViacijas DIvizions - Latvia)
 AVDI

Aviation Industries of Iran 
 AII AVA-101 
 AII AVA-202 
 AII AVA-303

Aviation Products
(Aviation Products, Ltd, Bitburg, Germany)
Aviation Products Star Trike

Aviation Traders 
 Aviation Traders Accountant
 Aviation Traders Carvair

Aviator 
(Aviator (aircraft manufacturer) - Russia)
 Aviator Retro
 Aviator Shershen'

Avibras 
(Sociedade Avibras Ltda / Avibras Indústria Aeroespacial)
 Avibras A-80 Falcao

AVIC 
(Avicopter - Avic Helicopter Company)
 AVIC AC311
 AVIC AC313
 AVIC ARJ-21
 AVIC L-15
 AVIC CY-1 is it the missile?
AVIC Lucky Bird
 AVIC Advanced Heavy Lifter

Avicar 
(Kenneth Bailey, Dearborn, MI)
 Avicar BF-8

Avid Aircraft 
(prev. Light Aero Inc, Caldwell, ID)
 Avid Flyer
 Avid Catalina
 Avid Champion
 Avid Bandit
 Avid MkIV
 Avid Amphibian
 Avid Explorer
 Avid Magnum
 Avid Speedwing

Aviméta 
(Sociéte pour la construction d'avion métallique [issu du groupe Schneider])
 Aviméta 82
 Aviméta 88 
 Aviméta 92
 Aviméta 92-230
 Aviméta 121
 Aviméta 132

Avimech
(Avimech International Aircraft, Inc.)
 Avimech DF-1 Dragonfly

Avioane Craiova
(Avioane Craiova S.A., Romania)
Avioane Craiova IAR-93 Vultur
IAR 95
IAR 99

Avio Design
(Avio Design Ltd, Kazanlak, Bulgaria)
Avio Delta Thruster
Avio Design Swan I
Avio Design Swan II

Avions Fairey
see also Tipsy
 Avions Fairey Belfair
 Avions Fairey Firefly
 Avions Fairey Fox
 Avions Fairey Junior
 Avions Fairey Tipsy Nipper
 Avions Fairey Tipsy M

Avions JDM
 JDM Roitelet

AvioTecnica
 AvioTecnica ES-101 Exec
 AvioTecnica ES-101 Raven

Aviotehas 
(V. Post, R. Neudorf, Estonia)
 Aviotehas PN-3

Aviotöökoda 
(Estonia)
 PON-1 - Post, Org & Neudorf
 PON-1A - Post, Org & Neudorf
 PON-2 - Post, Org & Neudorf
 PTO-4 - Post, Tooma & Org
 RTS-4

Avis 
(Anderlik-Varga-Iskola-Sport)
 AVIS I 
 AVIS II
 AVIS III
 AVIS IV

AvIS 
(Avio Industrie Stabiensi)
 AvIS C.4

Avro 

 Avro 500
 Avro 501
 Avro 502
 Avro 503
 Avro 504
 Avro 508
 Avro 510
 Avro 511
 Avro 514
 Avro 519
 Avro 521
 Avro 523 Pike
 Avro 529
 Avro 530
 Avro 531 Spider
 Avro 533 Manchester
 Avro 534 Baby
 Avro 536
 Avro 538
 Avro 539
 Avro 546
 Avro 547
 Avro 548
 Avro 549 Aldershot
 Avro 551
 Avro 552
 Avro 555 Bison
 Avro 556
 Avro Ava
 Avro 558
 Avro 560
 Avro 561 Andover
 Avro 562 Avis
 Avro 563
 Avro 566 Avenger
 Avro 567 Avenger II
 Avro 571 Buffalo
 Avro 572 Buffalo II
 Avro 581 Avian
 Avro 594 Avian
 Avro 584 Avocet
 Avro 604 Antelope
 Avro 605 Avian
 Avro 608 Hawk
 Avro 581 Avian series
 Avro 618 Ten
 Avro 619 Five
 Avro 621 Tutor
 Avro 622
 Avro 624 Six
 Avro 625 Avian Monoplane
 Avro 626 Prefect
 Avro 627 Mailplane
 Avro 631 Cadet
 Avro 636
 Avro 637
 Avro 638 Club Cadet
 Avro 638 Club Cadet Special
 Avro 639 Cabin Cadet
 Avro 640 Cadet
 Avro 641 Commodore
 Avro 642 Eighteen
 Avro 643 Cadet
 Avro 646 Sea Tutor
 Avro 652A Anson
 Avro 654
 Avro 671 Rota
 Avro 707
 Avro 720
 Avro 730
 Avro 748
 Avro Manchester
 Avro Lancaster
 Avro York
 Avro Tudor
 Avro Lancastrian
 Avro Lincoln
 Avro Lincolnian
 Avro Shackleton
 Avro Vulcan
 Avro Athena
 Avro Ashton
 Avro Mercury
 Avro RJ

Avro Canada 

 Avro Canada CF-100 Canuck
 Avro Canada C-102 Jetliner
 Avro Canada CF-103
 Avro Canada CF-105 Arrow
 Avro Canada VZ-9 AV Avrocar

Avro International Aerospace 
(regional jet division of BAE Systems)
 RJ70
 RJ85
 RJ100

Avtek
(Avtek Corp, Camarillo, CA)
 Avtek 400A

Awuza 
(Awuza HikoKenkyusho - Awuza Flight Research Studio)
 Awuza (ground taxi-ing) Trainer
 Awuza No.2 Seiho-go

AWWA 
 AWWA Sky Whale

Ayaks 
 Ayaks Concept

Aydlett 
(Donald E Aydlett)
 Aydlett A-1

Ayres 
(Fred Ayres)
 Ayres Let L 610
 Ayres LM200 Loadmaster
 Ayres Thrush
 Ayres Turbo-Thrush

Azcárate 
(Juan F. Azcárate)
 Azcárate E
 Azcárate O-E-1

Azalea Aviation
(Adel, GA)
Azalea Saberwing

Azionaria Vercelles 
see:AVIA (Azionaria Vercellese Industrie Aeronautica)

Aztec Nomad 
(Aztec Nomad Inc, Gravenhurst, Ontario, Canada)
 Aztec Nomad

References

Further reading

External links

 List of aircraft (0-A)